John Richard Darley (1799 – 1884), a "man who laboured strenuously to awaken and sustain the practical interest of the clergy and laity", was a 19th-century Irish Anglican bishop.

Born in County Monaghan and educated at the Royal School Dungannon and Trinity College, Dublin, he was later Headmaster of his old school. Ordained in 1826 he was the Rector of Drumgoon and Archdeacon of Ardagh before elevation to the episcopate as the 6th  bishop of the United Diocese of Kilmore, Elphin and Ardagh. In 1859, Darley both built and financed the running of a school at Cootehill, Co. Cavan. Today, this school is known as the Darley National School.

References

1799 births
People from County Monaghan
People educated at the Royal School Dungannon
Alumni of Trinity College Dublin
Archdeacons of Ardagh
19th-century Anglican bishops in Ireland
Bishops of Kilmore, Elphin and Ardagh
1884 deaths